HMS Repulse (S23) was a  ballistic missile submarine of the Royal Navy.

History
HMS Repulse was one of two Resolution-class ballistic missile submarines ordered from Vickers-Armstrongs on 8 May 1963, with a further two ordered from Cammell Laird the same day. Repulse was laid down at Vickers Armstrongs' Barrow-in-Furness shipyard on 12 March 1965 and was launched on 4 November 1967, She was launched by Lady Joan Zuckerman who was the wife of the Chief Scientific Advisor. Repulse ran aground in the Walney Channel during the launch, although she was undamaged and successfully floated off on the next high tide. She commissioned on 28 September 1968. She was the last of her class remaining in service with the navy, decommissioning in 1996.

References

External links  
 Submariners Association Barrow-in-Furness Branch

 

Resolution-class submarines
Ships built in Barrow-in-Furness
1967 ships
Cold War submarines of the United Kingdom